Nouvelair Limited Company, trading as Nouvelair Tunisie, or simply Nouvelair, is a Tunisian airline with its registered office in Tunis, while its head office in the Dhkila Tourist Zone in Monastir, near the Hôtel Sahara Beach. The airline operates tourist charters from European cities to Tunisian holiday resorts. Its main bases are Monastir Habib Bourguiba International Airport, Tunis–Carthage International Airport and Djerba–Zarzis International Airport.

History 
The airline was established in 1989 as Air Liberté Tunisie and started operations on 21 March 1990. It was founded as a charter affiliate of French operator Air Liberté. It is majority owned by Aziz Miled (who died in 2012) and has 614 employees (at March 2007).

Corporate affairs

Ownership and management
The airline is privately owned. Current shareholders are (July 2014) Tunisian Travel Service (TTS) (55%), Sofiat (20%), Carte (15%) and Marhaba Hotels (10%).

The CEO is Chokri Zarrad.

Business trends
Full annual reports do not appear to be published. In the absence of these, available information on trends is shown below (for years ending 31 December):

Destinations

Fleet

, Nouvelair operates the following aircraft:

References

External links

Official website
Official website 

Airlines of Tunisia
Airlines established in 1989
1989 establishments in Tunisia
Tunisian brands
Charter airlines